David R. Colman (January 4, 1949 – June 1, 2011) was an American neuroscientist who served as Director of the Montreal Neurological Institute and Hospital at McGill University and McGill University Health Centre until his death in June 2011.

Education
Colman graduated from Bronx High School of Science. He received a Bachelor of Science (Biology) with minors in English and Geology from New York University (1970) and a Ph.D. in Neuroscience from the State University of New York Downstate Medical Center (1977).

References

1949 births
2011 deaths
American neuroscientists
Academic staff of McGill University
SUNY Downstate Medical Center alumni
Canada Research Chairs
New York University alumni
The Bronx High School of Science alumni